Hồ Nguyên Trừng (chữ Hán: 胡元澄, pinyin Hu Yuancheng; also known as Lê Trừng, ; 1374? – 1446?) was a Vietnamese scholar, official, and engineer in exile in China. He was the oldest son of Emperor Hồ Quý Ly (1336–1407) and older brother of Emperor Hồ Hán Thương. Under the pen-name Nam Ông (南翁, Old Man of the South), he wrote the Nam Ông mộng lục (Hán tự: 南翁夢錄, literally Dream Memoir of Nam Ông).

Biography
Hồ Nguyên Trừng played a role in the Ming-Hồ war where he led the army of Đại Ngu (Hồ dynasty) as well as invented various new types of weapons for the Đại Ngu military. 
He is considered to be an innovator of firearms. One of his famous inventions was an early version of the "Eruptor" cannon, which was later adopted by the Ming dynasty to be used in many decked war vessels. After the fall of Hồ dynasty, Hồ was captured and he would spend the rest of his life in exile in China.

For his contribution to the manufacturing of the cannons for the Ming dynasty's military, Hồ was appointed as a high ranking official in the Ming dynasty's court. Nonetheless, his yearning for a return to his motherland never ceased to exist. He wrote a famous book, Nam Ông Mộng Lục (The Dream Memoirs of a Southern Man in English), containing various stories about some honorable people of Giao Chỉ (the former name of Viet Nam during the period of Chinese occupation) that he either knew personally or through historical facts as a dedication to his motherland.

References

Vietnamese engineers
1370s births
1440s deaths
Hồ dynasty
Firearm designers
Vietnamese writers
Ming dynasty writers
Vietnamese emigrants to China
Ming dynasty politicians
Hồ dynasty writers